Ákos Vereckei (Sometimes listes as Ákos Vereczkei, born August 26, 1977 in Budapest) is a Hungarian sprint canoeist who has competed since the late 1990s. Competing in three Summer Olympics, he won two gold medals in the K-4 1000 m events (2000, 2004).

Vereckei also won ten medals at the ICF Canoe Sprint World Championships with six golds (K-1 500 m: 1998, 1999, 2001; K-4 500 m: 1997, K-4 1000 m: 1999; K-4 1000 m: 2006), two silvers (K-2 1000 m: 2010, K-4 1000 m: 2003), and two bronzes (K-2 1000 m: 2002, K-4 500 m: 1999).

A member of the Budapest Honvéd FC club, he is 188 cm (6'1") tall and weighs 88 kg (194 lbs).

Awards
 Hungarian kayaker of the Year (6): 1998, 1999, 2001, 2002, 2003, 2004
 Honorary Citizen of Csepel (2000)

Orders and special awards
   Order of Merit of the Republic of Hungary – Officer's Cross (2000)
   Order of Merit of the Republic of Hungary – Commander's Cross (2004)
 Republic of Hungary Coat of arms, adorned with gold rings and Certificate of Merit (2008)

References
 
 
 
 Kataca.hu profile

External links
 
 

1977 births
Budapest Honvéd FC canoers
Canoeists at the 2000 Summer Olympics
Canoeists at the 2004 Summer Olympics
Canoeists at the 2008 Summer Olympics
Hungarian male canoeists
Living people
Olympic canoeists of Hungary
Olympic gold medalists for Hungary
Canoeists from Budapest
Olympic medalists in canoeing
ICF Canoe Sprint World Championships medalists in kayak
Medalists at the 2004 Summer Olympics
Medalists at the 2000 Summer Olympics
21st-century Hungarian people